Bhosari Assembly constituency is one of the Vidhan Sabha (legislative assembly) constituencies in Maharashtra state in India. This constituency is located near the cities of Pune and Chinchwad, and it is a segment of Shirur (Lok Sabha constituency).

Geographical scope
The constituency comprises ward nos. 8 to 12, 19 to 30, 59, 60, 80 to 86 of Pimpri-Chinchwad Municipal Corporation which lies in Haveli taluka.

Vidhan Sabha Members

Election Results

Assembly elections 2019

References

Assembly constituencies of Pune district
Assembly constituencies of Maharashtra